The Information Technology Contract and Recruitment Association (ITCRA), incorporated on 8 December 1998 and based in Melbourne, Australia, is a group of CEOs in the IT contract and recruitment industry who gathered together to air their concerns with each other about the state of the industry.

Philosophy
Aiming to be the pre-eminent body in the IT contract and recruitment industry in Australia and New Zealand, setting the direction for the industry and influencing its standards and code of practice.  ITCRA excels in representing its members' interests to government, employers and employees and in providing industry specific and cost efficient forums and programs.

Uppermost in their minds was the perception that a lack of professionalism was emerging that was generating an unfavourable image amongst client companies and contractors. They came to believe that the industry needed the sort of leadership that could only be provided by an industry specific body. They also believed that a code of ethics was needed to which industry CEOs committed their companies. Making the industry more efficient by the development of common form contracts, industry specific training programs for staff and contractors, recruitment forums and other projects in which they had a common interest were other joint activities that they wanted to pursue. 

Since incorporation, the Association’s Code of Conduct has been published; its collateral has been produced; its full-time secretariat has been appointed and its membership has been significantly enlarged.

Objectives
The Association’s objectives are to: 
 Enhance and promote the information technology contract and recruitment industry 
 Establish a Code of Conduct consistent with good practice and sound business objectives 
 Promote the professionalism and image of the industry 
 Conduct training and educational activities for the industry 
 Provide an industry forum/lobby group for specialist IT recruitment and contract labour providers

References

External links
 Official web site

Information technology organizations based in Oceania
Computer science-related professional associations
Organizations established in 1998